This is a list of awards and nominations of Asin Thottumkal, an Indian actress who has worked in Tamil, Telugu, Malayalam and Hindi movies. Asin has won a number of awards for her performance in various films in the Tamil, Telugu and Hindi industries, including the most coveted Kalaimamani award by the Chief Minister of Tamil Nadu in 2009. She has won various Filmfare awards and other prominent awards for her acting skills in all three major industries which she has been part of in her career. The three Filmfare awards, she has won so far includes, Filmfare Best Telugu Actress Award for Amma Nanna O Tamila Ammayi, Filmfare Best Tamil Actress Award for Ghajini and Filmfare Best Female Debut Award for her Hindi debut in Ghajini.

Asin was also awarded for her achievements and success in the field of entertainment by the government of Kerala in March 2012. The annual award is presented to women who are true icons for young women in Kerala. She quoted,

"I'm honoured and humbled. It was amazing to receive the award on home soil. Though I have attended several award ceremonies and won several honours all these years, this was singularly unique for me. It was special even for my family. Being recognised by people in the place where you come from has special significance."

Apart from her Filmfare awards, she has also won Santosham Best Actress Award for her performance in Shivamani and ITFA Best Actress Award for her portrayal of a Brahmin girl in Dasavathaaram. In 2012, she won the Pride of Kerala award at the Asianet Film Awards. Most recently she was honoured with the Pride of South Indian Cinema award at SIIMA 2013.

Filmfare Awards
The Filmfare Awards are presented annually by The Times Group to honour both artistic and technical excellence of professionals in the Hindi language film industry of India.

Filmfare Awards South
The Filmfare Awards South is a segment of Filmfare Awards, which is given to the South Indian film industry, that consists of the Tamil, Telugu, Malayalam and Kannada film industries.

International Indian Film Academy Awards
The International Indian Film Academy Awards (IIFA) are presented annually by the International Indian Film Academy to honour both artistic and technical excellence of professionals in Bollywood, the Hindi language film industry.

International Tamil Film Awards
The International Tamil Film Awards are presented annually by the International Indian Film Academy to honour both artistic and technical excellence of professionals in Kollywood, the Tamil language film industry.

Indian Television Academy Awards
The Indian Television Academy Awards is an annual event organised by the Indian Television Academy.

Santosham Film Awards
The Santosham Film Awards are presented by Santosham film magazine to honour excellence in Telugu films.

Screen Awards
The Screen Awards is the only awards ceremony in India to be involved with the Executive Director and the Governor of the Academy of Motion Picture Arts and Sciences. They are presented annually to honour professional excellence in the Hindi language film industry of India.

South Indian International Movie Awards
The South Indian International Movie Awards or commonly referred as SIIMA are given to honour excellence in the South Indian film industry. The awards are given for Tamil, Telugu, Malayalam and Kannada films.

Stardust Awards
The Stardust Awards is presented by Stardust magazine. They are presented annually to honour professional excellence in the Hindi language film industry of India.

Vijay Awards
The Vijay Awards are presented by the Tamil television channel STAR Vijay to honour excellence in Tamil cinema. It has given annually since 2007.

Times of India Most Desirable Women 
It is an annual poll conducted by Times Now to select the most desirable Men and Women in India.

Other awards and recognition
 2008: Anandalok Puraskar Awards, Best Actress (Hindi), Ghajini
 2009: Kalaimamani Award
 2012: Annual Award by Kerala Government

References

Lists of awards received by Indian actor